Torrington is a rural locality in Toowoomba in the Toowoomba Region, Queensland, Australia.

History 
Torrington was in the Shire of Jondaryan until the amalgamation in 2008 that created the Toowoomba Region.

Geography

A significant industrial area serving the Toowoomba region is located along the suburb's eastern boundary on Boundary Road.

References

External links
 

Suburbs of Toowoomba
Localities in Queensland